"Liberty Belle" is the first single off American rock band Katastrophy Wife's second album, All Kneel. The single peaked at #145 on the UK's Official Singles chart in June 2003.

Track listing

Personnel
 Bass – Andrew Parker
 Drums – Darren Donovan
 Engineer – Andrew Taylor
 Mixed By – Gavin Monaghan
 Producer – Gavin Monaghan, Kat Bjelland, Kurt-Pagan Davies
 Vocals, Guitar – Kat Bjelland

References

2003 singles